Mount Stuart is a locality in the City of Townsville, Queensland, Australia.

Geography 
The Ross River forms the western boundary of the locality. The Ross River Dam is at the south-west of the locality which forms Lake Ross which is the south-western boundary of the locality. The terrain is mountainous rising to the peak of Mount Stuart (584 metres). There is a lookout at the top of the mountain with views over the Townsville area. It is accessed via the Mount Stuart Road which commences at Stuart Drive in neighbouring Roseneath. As at November 2018, the locality is otherwise undeveloped.

History 
The mountain and hence the locality were named after Clarendon Stuart, a surveyor who undertook the first survey of the Town of Bowen in 1861. He also surveyed the first allotments in Townsville in 1865. In 1868 he worked in Gympie as the Gold Commissioner. Then he moved to New South Wales working in the office of the New South Wales Surveyor-General in 1884. From 1887 to his retirement in 1892, he was a clerk and schoolmaster at Bathurst Gaol. He was also a well-respected amateur artist who held several exhibitions. He died in Sydney in 1912.

References 

 
City of Townsville
Localities in Queensland